The Centro de Relaciones Internacionales (CRI, International Relations Center) is an educational and research institute belonging to Mexico's Universidad Nacional Autónoma de México (UNAM). Founded in 1970, the CRI is attached to UNAM's Facultad de Ciencias Políticas y Sociales (FCPyS, Faculty of Political and Social Sciences) and offers academic degrees in international relations studies and theory.

History
UNAM was the first academic institution in Mexico to implement study and research programs in the field of international relations studies. Its first university program in the area was created in 1952, called "Diplomatic Sciences Degree". This degree was created to offer  multidisciplinary studies combining elements from History, Law and Politics.

In 1968, a reform transformed the degree program to a dedicated "International Relations Degree". In 1970, the CRI was formed as a distinct research and teaching center under the auspices and administration of the political and social sciences faculty (FCPyS) to coordinate UNAM's programs and research in international relations topics.

Programs
Currently the CRI divides its teaching and research programs into six areas:

Theory and Methodology of International relations
International politics
International law
International economy
Mexican Foreign Policy
Regional Studies

References

External links
  International Relations Centre, FCPyS, UNAM
 Research Coordination of the Centre
 List of Researchers and Professors

Schools of international relations
Research institutes of international relations
National Autonomous University of Mexico